Alcalá de Henares Universidad is a railway station serving the University of Alcalá in the Community of Madrid, Spain. It is situated on the Madrid–Barcelona railway and is owned by Adif. The station is served by Cercanías Madrid lines C-2 and C-8.

References

Railway stations in Spain opened in 1975
Cercanías Madrid stations
Railway stations in the Community of Madrid
Buildings and structures in Alcalá de Henares